Peter Bennett (born 29 October 1969) is an Australian retired soccer player who is last known to have played for Penrith City SC in his home country.

Singapore

While featuring for Geylang United of the Singaporean S.League in 2003, Bennett was the victim of an attack by Singaporean footballer Shariff Abdul Samat in a league match, leaving him with a broken nose and getting Shariff banned for nine months. The Australian defender then made a complaint to the local authorities, resulting in the S.League's Disciplinary Committee convoking to formally decide the case.

References

External links 
 at OzFootball

Australian expatriate soccer players
Association football defenders
Geylang International FC players
Penrith City SC players
Parramatta Power players
APIA Leichhardt FC players
Australian soccer players
Living people
1969 births
Australian expatriate sportspeople in Singapore
Blacktown City FC players
Sydney United 58 FC players
Singapore Premier League players
Expatriate footballers in Singapore